The 1988 BCE Canadian Professional Championship was a professional non-ranking snooker tournament, which took place in September 1988 in Toronto, Canada. This was the last edition of the tournament.

Alain Robidoux won the title by beating Jim Wych 8–4 in the final.

Main draw

References

Canadian Professional Championship
1988 in snooker
1988 in Canadian sports